Harvey Sherwin Levy (June 8, 1902 - September 29, 1986) was an American professional football player who played in the National Football League (NFL) for the New York Yankees for 12 games in 1928.

References

1902 births
1986 deaths
New York Yankees (NFL) players